Brian D. Loney (born August 9, 1972) is a Canadian former professional ice hockey player.

Biography
Loney was born in Winnipeg, Manitoba. As a youth, he played in the 1985 Quebec International Pee-Wee Hockey Tournament with the Winnipeg South Monarchs minor ice hockey team.

Loney was named to the All-CCHA Rookie Team in the 1991-92 season. He later played twelve games in the National Hockey League with the Vancouver Canucks.

Career statistics

References

External links

1972 births
Living people
Canadian ice hockey right wingers
Ice hockey people from Winnipeg
Augsburger Panther players
Bolzano HC players
Central Texas Stampede players
Greensboro Generals players
Hamilton Canucks players
SHC Fassa players
Kassel Huskies players
Lukko players
Notre Dame Hounds players
Ohio State Buckeyes men's ice hockey players
Red Deer Rebels players
Rote Teufel Bad Nauheim players
Syracuse Crunch players
Vancouver Canucks players
Vancouver Canucks draft picks